Khawlah bint Hakim was one of the female companions of Muhammad.

She was married to Uthman bin Maz'oon, both being two of the earliest converts to Islam. She was the woman who asked the Prophet whether he would like to marry any woman again, after the death of Khadijah, as he had loved her dearly and needed to move on from his mourning.

After the consent of the Prophet, she conveyed the message to Sawdah bint Zam'ah (widow of Sakran bin Amr) and Abu Bakr for his daughter Aisha's hand in marriage.

widowhood 
In the 3rd year AH, Uthman ibn Maz'oon died. Some time later after the death of her husband, she asked prophet Muhammad to marry her. However he did not respond to her since he did not want to accept marriage proposals from any women after Khadijah. Khawlah remained a widow for the rest of her life.

See also
Khawlah (name)

References

Women companions of the Prophet